Ululodes is a genus of owlflies in the tribe Ululodini. There are 26 described species in Ululodes.

Species

 Ululodes apollinaris 
 Ululodes arizonensis 
 Ululodes banksi 
 Ululodes bicolor 
 Ululodes brachycerus 
 Ululodes cajennensis 
 U. c. cajennensis 
 U. c. nanus 
 Ululodes costanus 
 Ululodes flavistigma 
 Ululodes floridanus 
 Ululodes heterocerus 
 Ululodes macleayanus 
 U. m. macleayanus 
 U. m. sanctaeluciae 
 Ululodes mexicanus 
 Ululodes nigripes 
 Ululodes oppositus 
 Ululodes paleonesius 
 Ululodes pilosus 
 Ululodes quadripunctatus 
 Ululodes roseni 
 Ululodes sanctidomingi 
 Ululodes sinuatus 
 Ululodes smithi 
 Ululodes subvertens 
 Ululodes tuberculatus 
 Ululodes vetulus 
 Ululodes villosus 
 Ululodes walkeri

References

Further reading

 

Ascalaphidae